Autoridad Nasionala del Ladino ("National Authority of Ladino") is a national Israeli organisation created in 1997 with the goal of preserving and safeguarding Judaeo-Spanish, commonly known as Ladino.

The authority was established in the wake of a  law passed by the Knesset on 3 March 1996. It publishes the Ladino magazine Aki Yerushalayim for the Sephardi community in Israel and the diaspora. The first chairman of the board was the fifth president of Israel, Yitzhak Navon. The vice-president and editor-in-chief of Aki Yerushalayim is Moshe Shaul.

A successor organisation was announced by the Association of Spanish Language Academies in 2017.

Objectives 
 Propagate the knowledge and awareness of the Judeo-Spanish culture
 Helping founding and enriching active Judeo-Spanish cultural institutions
 Promoting, encouraging and helping the gathering, documentation and cataloging Judeo-Spanish literature.
 Publishing books by contemporary authors who write about Judeo-Spanish topics, either in their original language or Hebrew.
 Organising and promoting activities that can disseminate information about Sephardic communities  exterminated in the Holocaust

See also 
Cuisine of the Sephardic Jews
Academy of the Hebrew Language, a language regulator for Hebrew
YIVO, a language regulator for Yiddish

References

External links 
  
 The official Facebook page of the Autoridad Nasionala del Ladino i su Kultura
 Aki Yerushalayim magazine

Language regulators
Judaeo-Spanish
Civic and political organizations of Israel
Sephardi Jewish culture in Israel
1997 establishments in Israel